Peace, Love, Death Metal is the debut studio album by Eagles of Death Metal, released by AntAcidAudio on March 23, 2004.

Making of the album
Eagles of Death Metal is a garage rock band fronted by Jesse Hughes. The album was recorded primarily by Hughes (credited as "J. Devil Huge" or "Mr. Boogie Man") and Josh Homme (credit as "Carlo von Sexron" or "Baby Duck"), and featured guest appearances by Tim Vanhamel, Brody Dalle, Nick Oliveri, Alain Johannes, and Natasha Shneider.

Homme told MTV News that the band is led by Hughes: "I just sit behind the drums and play rock and roll, which is a great change of pace for me. J. Devil writes everything, every lyric and riff, and he's a fantastic songwriter. He and I go through and arrange them, and I lay down harmonies, but it's really his thing. It's the antithesis of the bloated rock-attitude bullshit I've had to deal with recently." Homme promoted the band and wore one of its t-shirts when appearing on the Lollapalooza tour with his main band Queens of the Stone Age in 2003.

Track listing
All tracks by Jesse Hughes and Josh Homme, except where noted.

On the UK and the European release there are two extra tracks: "Miss Sanders" and "Just Nineteen". A re-recorded version of the latter appears on the band's follow up Death By Sexy. The European release also featured the video for "Midnight Creeper". The band has shot videos for "I Only Want You" and "Speaking in Tongues". The melody for "Kiss the Devil" is based on the traditional folk song "Sugar Baby".

The band were performing the song "Kiss the Devil" at the Bataclan on 13 November 2015 when an attack killed 89 fans.

In popular culture
 "I Only Want You" was used in the 2004 racing game Gran Turismo 4, the series Queer as Folk, Windows 8 advertisements, and as downloadable content for the Rock Band video game series
 "Speaking in Tongues" was featured in the film Domino, the first episode of Supernatural, an episode of the TV show Viva La Bam, and in the film Watching The Detectives
 "Flames Go Higher" was used in an episode of the series The O.C. and the film Circle of Eight
 "Miss Alissa" was used in the 2014 Nike commercials named "Winner Stays On" and "The Last Game"
 "Stuck in the Metal" was used in the Shaun White snowboarding and skateboarding video The White Album
 "San Berdoo Sunburn" was used in the 2005 film Domino and the 2017 film Lammbock 2

Personnel
Eagles of Death Metal
Jesse Hughes ("J. Devil Huge") – guitar, vocals, drums on "Bad Dream Mama", "Already Died" & "Miss Alissa", +9 vorpal blade on "Bad Dream Mama"
Joshua Homme ("Baby Duck") – drums, backing vocals, percussion on "Bad Dream Mama", "Already Died" & "Miss Alissa", bass on "Whorehoppin' (Shit, Goddamn)"

Additional
Brody Dalle ("Queen (B)rodie") – backing vocals on "Speaking in Tongues"
Micah Roy "Strongarm" Hughes – backing vocals on "Speaking in Tongues", rhythm howling on "Miss Alissa"
Alain Johannes – piano on "English Girl", "Kiss the Devil" & "Wastin' My Time", backing vocals on "Wastin' My Time"
Nick Oliveri – bass on "Already Died" & "San Berdoo Sunburn"
Natasha Shneider – backing vocals on "Kiss the Devil"
Tim Vanhamel – backing vocals on "Speaking in Tongues"

References

External links 
Rolling Stone review
NME article

Eagles of Death Metal albums
2004 debut albums
Albums produced by Josh Homme